Józef Kondrat (3 March 1902 – 4 August 1974) was a Polish stage and film actor. He appeared in more than 30 films between 1933 and 1972.

Selected filmography
 Dvanáct křesel (1933)
 Każdemu wolno kochać (1933)
 Parade of the Reservists (1934)
 Police Chief Antek (1935)
 Kochaj tylko mnie (1935)
 A Diplomatic Wife (1937)
 Heimkehr (1941)
 A Matter to Settle (1953)
 Pożegnania (1958)
 The Impossible Goodbye (1962)

References

External links

1902 births
1974 deaths
Polish male film actors
People from Przemyśl
People from the Kingdom of Galicia and Lodomeria
Polish Austro-Hungarians
Polish male stage actors
Polish cabaret performers
20th-century comedians
20th-century Polish male actors